Space Vets was a 39-episode children's sci-fi show about a motley crew of misfit intergalactic space vets, broadcast from 1992 to 1994. The concept was devised by Stephen Edmondson and Jerome Vincent, but the characters were created by writer Christopher Middleton, and most of the 39 episodes written by him, too. Music for the series was produced by former Doctor Who composer Dominic Glynn.

Premise
They travel the cosmos in the spaceship Dispensable helping alien life forms in need, and transporting "The Meeloue" the rarest and most precious star in the universe, which when you place your hand on it will release a holographic string of words saying what you're thinking.

Cast
Mark Arden as Captain Skip Chip
Ann Bryson as Mona (The Receptionist)
Bernard Wright as No. 2
Robin Kingsland as Dogsbody
Linden Kirk as Captain K. Pubble
William Mannering, as Captain (series 2)

VHS release
One known VHS release was made of the series, it had five episodes from the second series of the show, including: 'The Shrunken Brain', 'Riddle of the Sands And Caves of Doom', 'Menace of the Machines' and 'Sunday Rotten Sunday'.

References

External links

1992 British television series debuts
1994 British television series endings
1990s British children's television series
Fictional physicians
BBC children's television shows
British science fiction television shows
English-language television shows
1990s British comic science fiction television series
British television shows featuring puppetry